Barsha Utsab ( Barṣā uṯsaba) also known an Barsha Mangal Utsab is a day-long Monsoon salutation festival celebrated in Bangladesh. The festival date is set according to the lunisolar Bengali calendar as the first day of its third month Asharh,  usually falls on 15 June of the Gregorian Calendar. This day is marked with colourful celebration included singing performances, drama, poetry recitation, screening of cinemas on rain, puppet show, Hilsha Fest and many other programmes. Traditionally women wear sky blue  saris to celebrate the first day of Wet season.

See also 
 Monsoon of South Asia
 Culture of Bangladesh
 Festivals of Bangladesh

References 

Bangladeshi culture
Festivals of Bangladeshi culture
Events in Bangladesh
Bengali culture
Folk festivals in Bangladesh
Cultural festivals in Bangladesh